"Woman, Amen" is a song co-written and recorded by American country music singer Dierks Bentley. It was released in January 2018 as the lead single from his 2018 album The Mountain. Bentley wrote this song with Josh Kear and Ross Copperman, the latter of whom also co-produced it.

Content
Dierks Bentley said that the song was inspired by his wife, Cassidy Black. He said that "I've come back from so many writing appointments over the past 12 years like 'I wrote this song about you' and she's like, 'Just because it's a love song doesn't mean it's about me.'"

The song is a "ringing, uptempo track" driven by a "propulsive groove" from drummer Matt Chamberlain. Rolling Stone described the song as having "bright, ringing guitars and vocals that as if shouted from a hilltop, while a rolling drumbeat embodies an avalanche of devotion for one's significant other." Bentley wrote with Josh Kear and Ross Copperman, the latter of whom also produced it. He said that the song was written after a series of songwriting sessions in Telluride, Colorado which produced most of the album's content, and that he was inspired after Kear provided the title line.

Commercial performance
The song debuted on Country Airplay at No. 29 on its radio release, and entered the Hot Country Songs chart at No. 23 the following week. It peaked at No. 1 on Country Airplay in June 2018 in its 25th week on the chart. It is Bentley's 16th No. 1 on the chart. It has sold 141,000 copies in the United States as of July 2018.

Personnel
Adapted from The Mountain liner notes.

 Dierks Bentley – lead vocals, background vocals
 Matt Chamberlain – drums
 Ross Copperman – background vocals, keyboards, programming
 Ian Fitchuk – bass guitar, keyboards
 Ben Helson – acoustic guitar, mandolin
 Jedd Hughes – acoustic guitar, electric guitar
 Josh Kear – background vocals
 Jon Randall – acoustic guitar, mandolin
 F. Reid Shippen – programming

Charts

Weekly charts

Year-end charts

Certifications

References

2018 singles
2018 songs
Dierks Bentley songs
Songs written by Dierks Bentley
Songs written by Josh Kear
Songs written by Ross Copperman
Song recordings produced by Ross Copperman
Capitol Records singles